OEM (International) Limited was a construction company based in Gibraltar.

The company issued a press release claiming that they would be creating a national airline for Gibraltar under the name of Fly Gibraltar. After a number of delays the project was cancelled in June 2007. There is no evidence that it was ever a serious undertaking.

OEM were responsible for the construction of several affordable Government of Gibraltar housing projects - Nelson’s View, Cumberland Terraces and Bayview Terraces.

On 4 April 2007 the Government announced the repossession of the sites, following the failure of OEM to satisfy the Government that they had sufficient funds available to complete the construction of the projects. The construction has been taken over by GRP Investments Company Limited, which is wholly owned by the Government.

References
 Government takes over OEM Affordable Housing Schemes

Construction and civil engineering companies of Gibraltar
Companies disestablished in 2007